George Young was an Australian stage manager and film director who worked in the silent era. He went into film after a career working for J.C. Williamson Ltd, making a number of movies for the Australian Film Syndicate. He was the brother of opera star Florence Young.

Filmography
The Golden West (1911)
Three Strings to Her Bow (1911)
The Octoroon (1912)
Strike (1912)
Gambler's Gold (1912)

References

External links

Australian film directors
Year of birth missing
Year of death missing